Julie; or, The New Heloise, originally entitled Lettres de Deux Amans, Habitans d'une petite Ville au pied des Alpes ("Letters from two lovers, living in a small town at the foot of the Alps"), is an epistolary novel by Jean-Jacques Rousseau, published in 1761 by Marc-Michel Rey in Amsterdam.

The novel's subtitle points to the history of Héloïse d'Argenteuil and Peter Abelard, a medieval story of passion and Christian renunciation. The novel was put on the Index Librorum Prohibitorum.

Overview
Although Rousseau wrote the work as a novel, a philosophical theory about authenticity permeates through it, as he explores autonomy and authenticity as moral values. A common interpretation is that Rousseau valued the ethics of authenticity over rational moral principles, as he illustrates the principle that one should do what is imposed upon him by society only insofar as it would seem congruent with one's "secret principles" and feelings, being constituent of one's core identity. Thus inauthentic behavior would pave the way to self-destruction.

Arthur Schopenhauer cited Julie as one of the four greatest novels ever written, along with Tristram Shandy, Wilhelm Meister's Apprenticeship and Don Quixote. It is thought that the virtuous atheist Wolmar is based on Baron d'Holbach, given his friendship and generous sponsorship of Rousseau.

Reception
Historian Robert Darnton has argued that Julie "was perhaps the biggest best-seller of the century". Publishers could not print copies fast enough so they rented the book out by the day and even by the hour. According to Darnton, there were at least 70 editions in print before 1800, "probably more than for any other novel in the previous history of publishing."

Readers were so overcome that they wrote to Rousseau in droves, creating the first celebrity author. One reader claimed that the novel nearly drove him mad from excess of feeling while another claimed that the violent sobbing he underwent cured his cold. Reader after reader describes their "tears", "sighs", "torments" and "ecstasies" to Rousseau. One wrote in a letter to Rousseau after finishing the novel:
I dare not tell you the effect it made on me. No, I was past weeping. A sharp pain convulsed me. My heart was crushed. Julie dying was no longer an unknown person. I believed I was her sister, her friend, her Claire. My seizure became so strong that if I had not put the book away I would have been as ill as all those who attended that virtuous woman in her last moments.

Some readers simply could not accept that the book was fiction. One woman wrote to Rousseau asking:
Many people who have read your book and discussed it with me assert that it is only a clever fabrication on your part. I can't believe that. If so, how could a mistaken reading have produced sensations like the ones I felt when I read the book? I implore you, Monsieur, tell me: did Julie really live? Is Saint-Preux still alive? What country on this earth does he inhabit? Claire, sweet Claire, did she follow her dear friend to the grave? M. de Wolmar, milord Édouard, all those persons, are they only imaginary as some want to convince me? If that be the case, what kind of a world do we inhabit, in which virtue is but an idea?
Other readers identified less with the individual characters and more with their general struggles. They saw in Julie a story of temptation, sin and redemption that resembled their own lives.

The success of Julie delighted Rousseau; he took pleasure in narrating a story about how a lady ordered a horse carriage to go to an Opera, and then picked up Julie only to continue reading the book till the next morning. So many women wrote to him offering their love that he speculated there was not a single high society woman with whom he would not have succeeded if he wanted to.

See also
 Public opinion

Notes

Bibliography

Books
 Santo L. Aricò, Rousseau's Art of persuasion in La nouvelle Héloïse, University Press of America, Lanham, 1994 
  Nouchine Behbahani, Paysages rêvés, paysages vécus dans La Nouvelle Héloïse de J.-J. Rousseau, Voltaire Foundation at the Taylor Institution, Oxford, 1989 
  L'Amour dans la nouvelle Héloïse : texte et intertexte : actes du colloque de Genève, 10-11-12 juin 1999, Éd. Jacques Berchtold, François Rosset, Droz, Genève, 2002 
  Jean-Marie Carzou, La Conception de la nature humaine dans la Nouvelle Héloïse, Sauret, Paris, 1966
  Charles Dédéyan, Jean-Jacques Rousseau : la Nouvelle Héloïse, ou, l'éternel retour, Nizet, Saint-Genouph, 2002 
  Charles Dédéyan, La Nouvelle Héloïse de Jean-Jacques Rousseau : étude d'ensemble, SEDES-CDU, Paris, 1990 
 Maurice R Funke, From saint to psychotic: the crisis of human identity in the late 18th century : a comparative study of Clarissa, La Nouvelle Héloise, Die Leiden des jungen Werthers, P. Lang, New York, 1983 
 James Fleming Jones, La Nouvelle Héloïse, Rousseau and utopia, Droz, Genève, 1977
 Peggy Kamuf, Fictions of Feminine Desire: Disclosures of Héloïse, U of Nebraska Press, Lincoln, 1982 
  François van Laere, Une Lecture du temps dans la Nouvelle Héloïse, La Baconnière, Neuchâtel, 1968
  Laurence Mall, Origines et retraites dans La nouvelle Héloïse, P. Lang, New York, 1997 
  William Mead, Jean-Jacques Rousseau, ou le Romancier enchaîné ; étude de la nouvelle Héloïse, Presses universitaires de France, Paris, 1966
  Daniel Mornet, La Nouvelle Héloïse de J.-J. Rousseau ; étude et analyse, Mellottée Paris, 1929
  Perry Reisewitz, L'Illusion salutaire : Jean-Jacques Rousseaus Nouvelle Héloïse als ästhetische Fortschreibung der philosophischen Anthropologie der Discours, Romanistischer Verlag, Bonn, 2000 
  Yannick Séité, Du Livre au lire : La nouvelle Héloïse, roman des lumières, Champion, Paris, 2002 
  Étienne Servais, Le Genre romanesque en France depuis l'apparition de la Nouvelle Héloïse jusqu'aux approches de la Révolution, M. Lamertin, Bruxelles, 1922
  Anne Tilleul, La Vertu du beau : essai sur La nouvelle Héloïse, Humanitas nouvelle optique, Montréal, 1989

Articles
  Nouchine Behbahani, Paysages rêvés, paysages vécus dans La Nouvelle Héloïse de J. J. Rousseau, Voltaire Foundation at the Taylor Institution, Oxford, 1989, 
  Jacques Berchtold, "L'Impossible Virginité du jardin verbal : les Leçons de la nature selon la Lettre IV, 11 de La Nouvelle Héloïse", Éd. et préf. Jürgen Söring, Peter Gasser, Rousseauismus: Naturevangelium und Literatur, Frankfurt, Peter Lang, 1999, pp. 53–83 
  Nadine Bérenguier, "Le 'Dangereux Dépôt': Virginité et contrat dans Julie ou La Nouvelle Héloïse ", Eighteenth-Century Fiction, July 1997, n° 9 (4), pp. 447–63
  André Blanc, "Le Jardin de Julie", Dix-huitième Siècle, 1982, n° 14, pp. 357–76
  Luciano Bulber, "Jean-Jacques Rousseau, peintre de la nature-état d'âme dans La Nouvelle Héloïse", Kwartalnik Neofilologiczny, 1988, n° 35 (4), pp. 415–29
  Henri Coulet, "Couples dans La Nouvelle Héloïse", Littératures, Fall 1989, n° 21, pp. 69–81
  Catherine Cusset, "Cythère et Elysée: Jardin et plaisir de Watteau à Rousseau", Dalhousie French Studies, Winter 1994, n° 29, pp. 65–84
  Claude Labrosse, Éd. K. Kupisz, G.-A. Pérouse, J.-Y. Debreuille, "La Figure de Julie dans La Nouvelle Héloïse", Le Portrait littéraire, Lyon, PU de Lyon, 1988, pp. 153–58
  Michel Delon, "La Nouvelle Héloïse et le goût du rêve", Magazine Littéraire, Sept 1997, n° 357, pp. 36–38
  Arbi Dhifaoui, "L'Épistolaire et/ou la violence dans La Nouvelle Héloïse de Rousseau", Éd. et intro. Martine Debaisieux, Gabrielle Verdier, Violence et fiction jusqu'à la Révolution, Tübingen, Narr, 1998, pp. 357–66
  Jean Ehrard, "Le Corps de Julie", Éd. Raymond Trousson, Michèle Biblio. Mat-Hasquin, Jacques Lemaire, Ralph Heyndels, Thèmes et figures du siècle des Lumières : mélanges offerts à Roland Mortier, Genève, Droz, 1980, pp. 95–106
  Anne Srabian de Fabry, "L'Architecture secrète de La Nouvelle Héloïse", Australian Journal of French Studies, 1982 Jan.–Apr., n° 19 (1), pp. 3–10
  Anne Srabian de Fabry, "Quelques observations sur le dénouement de La Nouvelle Héloïse", French Review, Oct 1972, n° 46 (1), pp. 2–8
  R. J. Howells, "Désir et distance dans La Nouvelle Héloïse", Studies on Voltaire and the Eighteenth Century, 1985, n° 230, pp. 223–32
  R. J. Howells, "Deux histoires, un discours : La Nouvelle Héloïse et le récit des amours d'Émile et Sophie dans l'Émile", Studies on Voltaire and the Eighteenth Century, 1987, n° 249, pp. 267–94
  François Jost, "La Nouvelle Héloïse, Roman Suisse", Revue de Littérature Comparée, 1962, n° 35, pp. 538–65
  Tanguy L'Aminot, "L'Amour courtois dans La Nouvelle Héloïse", Piau-Gillot, Colette Éd. Desné, Roland Éd. L'Aminot, Tanguy Éd. Modernité et pérennité de Jean-Jacques Rousseau. Champion, Paris, 2002, pp. 241–57
  Claude Labrosse, "Nouveauté de La Nouvelle Héloïse," Eighteenth-Century Fiction, Jan–Apr 2001, n° 13 (2–3), pp. 235–46
  J.-L. Lecercle, "L'Inconscient et création littéraire : sur La Nouvelle Héloïse", Études Littéraires, 1969, n° 1, pp. 197–204
  Annie Leclerc, "Jean-Jacques Rousseau : l'Amour au pays des chimères", Magazine Littéraire, Par 1995, n° 331, pp. 31–34
  Pierre Rétat, Litteratures, "L'Économie rustique de Clarens", 1989 Fall; 21: 59–68
 Laurence Mall, "Les Aberrations de l'errance : le Voyage dans La Nouvelle Héloïse", Australian Journal of French Studies, 1994, n° 31 (2), pp. 175–87
  Francine Markovits, "Rousseau et l'éthique de Clarens : une économie des relations humaines", Stanford French Review, 1991, n° 15 (3), pp. 323–48
  Ourida Mostefai, Lectures de La Nouvelle Héloïse, N. Amer. Assn. for the Study of Jean-Jacques Rousseau, Ottawa, 1993 
  Philip Knee, "Wolmar comme médiateur politique", pp. 117–27
  Guy Lafrance, "L'Éthique de La Nouvelle Héloïse et du Vicaire Savoyard", pp. 141–50
 Jim MacAdam, "Reading Julie Amour-propre-ly", pp. 107–16
  Laurence Mall, pp. 163–73", "L'Intérieur et l'extérieur : Étude des lettres parisiennes dans La Nouvelle Héloïse", pp. 163–73
  Jean Roussel, pp. 61–72", "La Nouvelle Héloïse et la politique : de l'écart à l'emblème", pp. 61–72
  Teresa Sousa de Almeida, "La Circulation des lettres dans le roman ou le Partage des pouvoirs", pp. 175–84
  Jean Terrasse, pp. 129–39", "Jean-Jacques, Saint-Preux et Wolmar : aspects de la relation pédagogique", pp. 129–39
  Loïc Thommeret, "De La Nouvelle Héloïse aux Confessions, une triade infernale", pp. 213–21
  María José Villaverde, "L'Égalité dans La Nouvelle Héloïse", pp. 73–84
 Ruth Ohayon, "Rousseau's Julie; Or, the Maternal Odyssey", College Language Association Journal, Sept. 1986, n° 30 (1), pp. 69–82
  Robert Osmont, "Expérience vécue et création romanesque : le sentiment de l'éphémère dans La Nouvelle Héloïse", Dix-huitième Siècle, 1975, n° 7, pp. 225–42
  Paul Pelckmans, "Le Rêve du voile dans La Nouvelle Héloïse", Revue Romane, 1982, n° 17 (1), pp. 86–97
  René Pomeau, "Le Paysage de La Nouvelle Héloïse : l'Asile, l'espace", The Feeling for Nature and the Landscape of Man, Éd. Paul Hallberg, Gothenburg, Kungl. Vetenskaps & Vitterhets-Samhället, 1980, pp. 132–42
  Jean Roussel, "La Douleur de Saint-Preux", Éd. Carminella Biondi, Carmelina Imbroscio, Marie-Josée Latil, Nadia Minerva, Carla Pellandra, Adriana Sfragaro, Brigitte Soubeyran, Paola Vecchi, La Quête du bonheur et l'expression de la douleur dans la littérature et la pensée françaises. Genève, Droz, 1995, pp. 371–79
  Jean Roussel, "La Faute, le rachat et le romanesque dans La Nouvelle Héloïse", Travaux de Littérature, 1995; 8: 209–20
  Timothy Scanlan, "Perspectives on the Nuits d'amour in Rousseau's La Nouvelle Héloïse", AUMLA, Nov 1993, n° 80, pp. 93–79
  Norbert Sclippa, "L'Idéal politique et l'idée de Nation dans La Nouvelle Héloïse", Jean-Jacques Rousseau, politique et nation, Intro. Robert Thiéry, Paris, Champion, 2001, XXIV, pp. 101–08
  Norbert Sclippa, "La Nouvelle Héloïse et l'aristocratie", Studies on Voltaire and the Eighteenth Century, 1991, n° 284, pp. 1–71
  Norbert Sclippa, "La Nouvelle Héloïse, la noblesse et la bourgeoisie", Studies on Voltaire and the Eighteenth Century, 1989, n° 265, pp. 1617–19
  Jean-Paul Sermain, "La Nouvelle Héloïse ou l'invention du roman-poème"", Éd. Colette Piau-Gillot, Roland Desné, Tanguy L'Aminot, Modernité et pérennité de Jean-Jacques Rousseau, Paris, Champion, 2002, pp. 227–40
  Jean Sgard, "De Cunégonde à Julie", Recherches et Travaux, 1996, n° 51, pp. 121–30
  Lieve Spaas, "D'un Clarens à l'autre : structures du désir sexuel dans La Nouvelle Héloïse", Studies on Voltaire and the Eighteenth Century, 1991, n° 284, pp. 73–82
  Jean Starobinski, "Jean-Jacques Rousseau : Jours uniques, plaisirs redoublés", Thèmes et figures du siècle des Lumières : mélanges offerts à Roland Mortier, Éd. Raymond Trousson Michèle Mat-Hasquin, Jacques Lemaire, Ralph Heyndels, Genève, Droz, 1980, pp. 285–97
  Raymond Trousson, "De Jacques à Jean-Jacques ou du bon usage de La Nouvelle Héloïse", Éd. Elio Mosele, Intro. Pierre Brunel, George Sand et son temps, I–III. Slatkine, Genève, 1994, pp. 749–66
  Raymond Trousson, "Le Rôle de Wolmar dans La Nouvelle Héloïse", Éd. Raymond Trousson, Michèle Mat-Hasquin, Jacques Lemaire, Ralph Heyndels, Thèmes et figures du siècle des Lumières : mélanges offerts à Roland Mortier, Genève, Droz, 1980, pp. 299–306
  Joseph Waldauer, "La Solitude et la communauté dans La Nouvelle Héloïse", Studies on Voltaire and the Eighteenth Century, 1989, n° 265, pp. 1271–74
 Hans Wolpe, "Psychological Ambiguity in La Nouvelle Héloise", University of Toronto Quarterly, 1959, n° 28, pp. 279–90

External links

 Original text in French from Rousseau online
 English translation by William Kenrick of all volumes (namely: vol. 1, vol. 2, vol. 3, and vol. 4) are available via Internet Archive

1761 novels
18th-century French novels
Epistolary novels
French philosophical novels
Works by Jean-Jacques Rousseau
Novels set in Switzerland